Parakkadavu Weir  (Malayalam : പാറക്കടവ് തടയണ ) is a concrete  diversion dam  constructed across Parakkadavu river in Vellathooval panchayath of Vellathooval village in Idukki district of Kerala,  India. Parakkadavu weir is constructed as a part of Panniar Augmentation Scheme. Spill water from R A Headworks in Mudirappuzha river is partly diverted at Ellackal through a tunnel to Parakkadavu weir. From Parakkadavu weir the water is diverted to Mullakkanam weir and from this weir to Ponmudi reservoir.

Specifications

Latitude : 10⁰ 0′ 39 ” N
Longitude: 77⁰ 01′ 58” E
Panchayath : Vellathooval
Village : Vellathooval
District : Idukki
Type of DamConcrete
Classification:Weir
Maximum Water Level :  (MWL)
Full Reservoir Level ( FRL) : EL 722.3 m 
Storage at FRL : Diversion only

References 

Dams in Kerala
Dams in Idukki district